Brice Dulin (Born 13 April 1990) is a French rugby union player. His usual position is Fullback, and he currently plays for La Rochelle in the Top 14. He began his career at SU Agen, making his professional debut in 2009. He made his debut for France during their tour of Argentina in June 2012.

Honours

Club 
 Castres
Top 14: 2012–13

 Racing 92
Top 14: 2015–16

 La Rochelle
European Rugby Champions Cup: 2021–2022

External links
France profile at FFR

References

1990 births
Living people
French rugby union players
Sportspeople from Agen
SU Agen Lot-et-Garonne players
Castres Olympique players
Racing 92 players
Stade Rochelais players
France international rugby union players
Rugby union fullbacks